CBTA may refer to:

 Compton–Belkovich Thorium Anomaly (CBTA), a lunar hotspot
 Cornell Branch of the Telluride Association (CBTA), the Telluride House at Cornell University
 Cyclobutane tetracarboxylic dianhydride (CBTA), the product of the dimerization of maleic anhydride
 CBTA (High school), a type of professional secondary school in Mexico
 CBTA, a television station in Lynn Lake, Manitoba, Canada
 CBTA/CBUA, code for a straight-five engine on some models of the Volkswagen Beetle (A5)
 CBTA-FM, a rebroadcaster for radio station CBTK-FM in Trail, British Columbia, Canada